Artemisia aleutica, the Aleutian wormwood, is a rare species of flowering plant endemic to Alaska. It is known only from the western Aleutian Islands, where it is limited to Kiska and Hawadax Islands in the Rat Island group.

Only 2 populations are known.

References

External links

aleutica
Flora of Alaska
Plants described in 1939